Buck Privates is a 1941 musical military comedy film that turned Bud Abbott and Lou Costello into bona fide movie stars. It was the first service comedy based on the peacetime draft of 1940. The comedy team made two more service comedies before the United States entered the war (In the Navy and Keep 'Em Flying). A sequel to this movie, Buck Privates Come Home, was released in 1947. Buck Privates is one of three Abbott and Costello films featuring The Andrews Sisters, who were also under contract to Universal Pictures at the time.

Abbott and Costello performed a one-hour radio adaptation of the film on the Lux Radio Theatre on October 13, 1941.

Plot
Slicker Smith and Herbie Brown are sidewalk peddlers who hawk neckties out of a suitcase. Chased by a cop, they duck into a movie theater, not realizing that it is now being used as an Army enlistment center. Believing that they are signing up for theater prizes, they accidentally enlist.

Meanwhile, spoiled playboy Randolph Parker and his long-suffering valet, Bob Martin, also report to the theater. Randolph expects his influential father to pull some strings so he can avoid military service. Bob, on the other hand, takes his military obligations in stride. Tensions between the two men escalate further with the introduction of Judy Gray, a camp hostess and a friend of Bob's upon whom Randolph sets his sights.

At boot camp, Slicker and Herbie are mortified to discover that Collins, the policeman who chased them, is now their sergeant. Randolph, meanwhile, learns that his father will not use his influence on his behalf, believing that a year in the Army will do Randolph some good. For all the difficulties, camp life isn't so bad, since The Andrews Sisters appear at regular intervals to sing sentimental or patriotic tunes (including "Boogie Woogie Bugle Boy") and Herbie continues to foul up with little consequence.

Although he is an expert marksman, Randolph skips an army shooting match in order to spend the afternoon with Judy. The company loses the match and all the money they had bet on him, causing them to resent him even more. However, during a war game exercise, Randolph redeems himself by saving Bob and coming up with a ruse to win the sham battle for his company. He is finally accepted by his unit and wins Bob's and Judy's admiration in the process. When he learns that he's been accepted to Officer Training School, he initially refuses, believing that his father's political influence was responsible. However, his commanding officer assures him that his training record and recommendations from his superiors factored in the decision. Bob has also been offered an appointment to OTS, and Judy announces that she will be joining them there as a hostess. Meanwhile, Smitty and Herbie accept Collins' invitation to shoot dice, but Herbie ends up (literally) losing his pants.

Cast
 Bud Abbott as Slicker Smith
 Lou Costello as Herbie Brown
 Lee Bowman as Randolph Parker III
 Jane Frazee as Judy Gray
 Alan Curtis as Bob Martin
 Nat Pendleton as Sgt. Michael Collins
 The Andrews Sisters as Themselves
 Samuel S. Hinds as Maj. Gen. Emerson
 Harry Strang as Sgt. Callahan
 Nella Walker as Mrs. Karen Parker
 Leonard Elliott as Henry
 Shemp Howard as Chef

Production
Buck Privates was filmed from December 13, 1940, through January 11, 1941. It was originally budgeted at $233,000 over 20 days; in the end it was $12,000 over budget and four days over schedule.

The "drill routine", where Smitty tries to get Herbie and other soldiers to march in formation, was actually a series of shorter takes that were strung together to expand the bit to more than three minutes of screen time. Abbott and Costello had been performing this sketch on stage for more than three years.

Lubin recalled the film "was very strange to shoot because they didn't go by much of a shooting script. Being burlesque comedians they just did their old routines. They would say 'This routine is "Spit in the Bush".'... And they would have to act it for me and show it what it was. The entire first script was a series of titled gags. I would just say 'We'll take a close up here and a two shot here'. I never interfered. There were was nothing I could do because these were tried and true old burlesque things that they and their forefathers and their forefathers, probably since the Greek period, had done."

Reception
Director Arthur Lubin recalled: "the studio was a little uncertain about how they were going to be accepted. But at the first preview the audience just died. Buck Privates was a very, very funny show. And, actually, I must say it was very little credit to the director. It consisted mainly of fabulous gags that these two wonderful guys knew from years and years of being in burlesque." 

The film was one of Universal's biggest money-makers of the year, grossing over $4 million at the box office at a time when movie tickets averaged 25 cents and gross was defined as money earned by the studio; today it refers to all of the money that a film made. Universal gave Lubin—who was under contract at a fixed salary—a $5,000 bonus and told him to start on another film, Hold That Ghost, almost immediately. Lubin directed five Abbott and Costello films in ten months.

Critical
The film received positive reviews from critics. Theodore Strauss of The New York Times called it "an hour and a half of uproarious monkeyshines. Army humor isn't apt to be subtle and neither are Abbott and Costello. Their antics have as much innuendo as a 1,000-pound bomb but nearly as much explosive force."

The reviewer for Variety wrote: "Geared at a zippy pace, and providing lusty and enthusiastic comedy of the broadest slapstick, Buck Privates is a hilarious laugh concoction that will click solidly in the general runs for profitable biz."

Film Daily enthused: "If ever a 'sleeper' appeared out of Hollywood, this is it ... the attraction is a grand, madcap musical which packs a whale of a wallop for the general public liking laughs galore on the frankly slapstick side."

Harrison's Reports described it as "A good comedy for the masses ... Abbott and Costello definitely establish themselves as a comedy team that should win wide popularity."

Award nominations
The film received two Academy Award nominations in 1941. Hughie Prince and Don Raye were nominated for the Academy Award for Best Original Song for "Boogie Woogie Bugle Boy" and Charles Previn was nominated for the Academy Award for Original Music Score (Scoring of a Musical Picture).

World War II
Japan used this film as propaganda to demonstrate to its own troops the "incompetence" of the United States Army. The film was shown to U.S. troops in every theater of war.

Rerelease
It was re-released in 1948, and again on a double bill with Keep 'Em Flying in 1953 during the Korean War.

Andrews Sisters
The Andrews Sisters perform four songs in the film: "You're a Lucky Fellow, Mr. Smith", "Boogie Woogie Bugle Boy", "Bounce Me Brother, With a Solid Four", and "(I'll Be With You) In Apple Blossom Time". The composers of the first three of these songs, Don Raye and Hughie Prince, appear in the film as new recruits alongside Abbott and Costello. "Boogie Woogie Bugle Boy" was nominated for an Academy Award.

The studio was against using "(I'll Be With You) In Apple Blossom Time" because of fees demanded by the music publisher. The Andrews Sisters paid the fee themselves, and it went on to become one of their most requested songs.

"Bounce Me Brother, With a Solid Four" also features one of the more famous Lindy Hop dance sequences of the swing era. Many dancers from Los Angeles, including Dean Collins, Jewel McGowan, Ray Hirsch, and Patty Lacey, are featured.

Home media 
This film was released on VHS and Beta in 1983, then re-released on VHS in 1989 and again in 1991. It has been released three times on DVD, first as single DVD on April 1, 1998 , and later as part of two different Abbott and Costello collections.  The first time, on The Best of Abbott and Costello Volume One, on February 10, 2004, and again on October 28, 2008 as part of Abbott and Costello: The Complete Universal Pictures Collection.  A Blu-ray edition was released on April 17, 2012.

Trivia
Judy mentions that her father was a Captain in the "Fighting 69", a reference to The Fighting 69th.

In popular culture
The film is advertised on a cinema marquee in 1941.

References

External links

 
 
 
 
 Review of film at Variety

1941 films
1941 musical comedy films
American black-and-white films
American musical comedy films
1940s English-language films
Abbott and Costello films
American World War II films
Military humor in film
Films set in a movie theatre
Universal Pictures films
Films directed by Arthur Lubin
Films about the United States Army
1940s war comedy films
American war comedy films
1940s American films